Hecate is a Titaness in ancient Greek religion and mythology.

Hecate or Hekate may also refer to:

Fictional characters
Hecate (Dune)
Hecate (Marvel Comics)
Hecate (Shakugan no Shana)
Hecate, queen of the witches in Macbeth
Hecate, a member of Xavier's Security Enforcers in Marvel comics
Hecate, a character in Hellboy

Ships
, the name of several Royal Navy ships
USS Hecate, known earlier as USS Etlah, a single-turreted, twin-screw monitor laid down in 1864

Other uses
Hécate, a 1982 French-Swiss film
Hecate (Amazon), a mythological Amazon who fell at Troy
Hecate (journal), an Australian feminist academic journal
Hecate (musician) (born 1976)
Hecate (William Blake) or The Night of Enitharmon's Joy, a 1795 work of art
100 Hekate, an asteroid
Hecate Strait, a strait in British Columbia, Canada
Hecate Island
2,5-Dimethoxy-4-ethylamphetamine or Hecate, a psychedelic drug
Hecate, an 0-8-0 tank locomotive built for the Kent & East Sussex Railway

See also
Memoirs of Hecate County, a 1946 book by Edmund Wilson
PGM Hécate II, a French sniper rifle